Newcombe Harbour is a natural harbour located within the traditional territory of the Gitxaala Nation, on Pitt Island, British Columbia, Canada. Currently named after Captain Holmes Newcombe who was with the Fisheries Protection Service from 1903 to 1923.

The harbor has drying banks at its head, and is surrounded by nine mountains.

References

North Coast of British Columbia